Countrysides is Cracker's sixth studio album.

Track listing
 "Truckload of Art" (Terry Allen) - 3:42
 "Duty Free" (Ike Reilly) - 5:53
 "Up Against the Wall Redneck Mothers" (Ray Wylie Hubbard) - 4:09
 "Sinaloa Cowboys" (Bruce Springsteen) - 3:53
 "Family Tradition" (Hank Williams, Jr.) - 4:42
 "The Bottle Let Me Down" (Merle Haggard) - 4:40
 "Reasons to Quit" (Merle Haggard) - 3:29
 "Buenas Noches from a Lonely Room" (Dwight Yoakam) - 3:46
 "Ain't Gonna Suck Itself" (David Lowery) - 5:49

Before the release of the album, Cracker had been touring under the name "Ironic Mullet" at various dive bars across the American South and in Alaska.  Mostly covers, the songs reflect on the political climate of the time.

Personnel

 David Lowery – vocals, guitar
 Johnny Hickman – lead guitar, vocals
 Brandy Wood – bass, vocals
 Frank Funaro – drums

References

2003 albums
Cracker (band) albums
Albums produced by David Lowery (musician)
Covers albums